Stenus melanarius is a species of rove beetle widely spread in Asia and Europe. It is a natural predator of the pest, Cnaphalocrocis medinalis.

Subspecies
Two subspecies are recognized:
 Stenus melanarius melanarius Stephens, 1833
 Stenus melanarius verecundus Sharp, 1874

References 

Staphylinidae
Insects of Sri Lanka
Insects of India
Insects described in 1833